Palaeosiccia major is a moth of the  subfamily Arctiinae. It is found in Uganda.

References

Endemic fauna of Uganda
Lithosiini